The 2009 Australian Production Car Championship was a CAMS sanctioned motor racing title for drivers of Group 3E Series Production Cars. It was the 16th Australian Production Car Championship title to be awarded by CAMS. As well as claiming the Class A2 title, Garry Holt won the overall championship in his BMW 335i. Holt held off Class A1 champion Rod Salmon by just two points in the overall standings. Other class champions were Jake Camilleri in his Mazda 3 MPS (Class B) and Stuart Jones' Toyota Celica (Class C).

Calendar
The championship was contested concurrently with the 2009 Australian Manufacturers' Championship, over a five-round series.  
 Round 1, Wakefield Park, New South Wales, 25–26 April
 Round 2, Eastern Creek Raceway, New South Wales, 18–19 July
 Round 3, Morgan Park Raceway, Queensland, 8–9 August
 Round 4, Oran Park Raceway, New South Wales, 29–30 August
 Round 5, Sandown Raceway, Victoria, 28–29 November
Rounds 1 to 4 each comprised three 20-minute races with one driver per car.
Round 5 was staged as two x one hour races with one or two drivers per car.
The third race of each three race round employed a handicap start.

Class Structure
Cars competed in the following six classes: 
 Class A1 : High Performance (All Wheel Drive)
 Class A2 : High Performance (Rear Wheel Drive)
 Class B : Production (Sedan / Hatch)
 Class C : Production Sport
 Class D : Small Cars
 Class E : Alternative Energy

There were no entries for Class D or Class E

Points system
Two points were awarded to the driver setting the fastest qualifying time for each class at each round.
For races with standing starts, points were awarded to drivers based on their finishing positions within their class.
For races with handicap starts, points were awarded to drivers based on their outright finishing positions.
Points were awarded in each race of two race rounds on a 45-36-30-27-24-21-18-15-12-9-6-3 basis with an additional point for each other finisher.
Points were awarded in each race of three-race rounds on a 30-24-20-18-16-14-12-10-8-6-4-2 basis with an additional point for each other finisher.

Results

Class results

References

External links
 Production Car Association of Australia  
 Race Results Archive at www.natsoft.com.au 
 Images from the Sandown round.

Australian Production Car Championship
Production Car Championship